This is a list of notable events in music that took place in the year 1996.

Specific locations
1996 in British music
1996 in Norwegian music

Specific genres
1996 in classical music
1996 in country music
1996 in heavy metal music
1996 in hip hop music
1996 in Latin music
1996 in jazz

Events

January
 January 8 – Robert Hoskins is found guilty and convicted on five charges of assault, stalking, and threatening to kill Madonna.
 January 16
 At the trial of two American teenagers, Nicholaus McDonald and Brian Bassett, for the murder of Bassett's parents and young brother, defense lawyers attempt to lay the blame for the murders on the fact the pair had been listening to "Israel's Son" by Silverchair prior to the crimes, which are  dubbed the "Israel's Son Murders". Murmur Records released an official response, stating that Silverchair do not condone violence of any kind and that the song "seeks to criticize violence and war by portraying them in all their horror."
 Jamaican authorities open fire on Jimmy Buffett's seaplane, Hemisphere Dancer, mistaking it for a drug trafficker's plane. U2 singer Bono and Island Records executive, Chris Blackwell, are also on the plane; no-one is injured.
 January 18 – Lisa Marie Presley files for divorce from Michael Jackson.
 January 19–February 4 – The Big Day Out festival takes place in Australia and New Zealand, headlined by Porno for Pyros and Rage Against the Machine.
 January 25 – Madonna receives death threats from Argentine Peronists who are enraged and insulted that she is playing Eva Peron in Evita. After she arrives in Argentina, over 50 walls throughout the city have been spray-painted with the words: ¡Viva Evita! ¡Fuera Madonna! (Long Live Evita! Get Out, Madonna!).
 January 26 – The controversial musical Rent is given its first public performance at the New York Theatre Workshop, a day after the death of its creator, Jonathan Larson.
 January 28 – Chris Isaak makes a guest appearance on the television show Friends.
 January 29
 La Fenice opera house in Venice, Italy, is destroyed by fire.
 Kiss reveals that they have reunited with original members Ace Frehley and Peter Criss, with a surprise appearance on the American Music Awards. The band took to the podium in full makeup and costume for the first time since 1983.
 Garth Brooks refuses to accept his American Music Award for Favorite Overall Artist, briefly explaining his belief that all music is "made up of a lot of people".

February
 February 4 – Former Milli Vanilli band member Rob Pilatus is hospitalized when a man hits him over the head with a baseball bat in Hollywood, while Pilatus is attempting to steal the man's car.
 February 13
 Tupac Shakur releases the first ever rap double album, All Eyez on Me, one of the most influential albums in hip hop history. All Eyez on Me achieves platinum sales in just four hours and reaches No. 1 on the Billboard 200 charts.
 Take That formally announce that they are splitting up.
 February 14 – The Artist Formerly Known As Prince marries backup dancer Mayte Garcia who is fifteen years his junior.
 February 19 – Jarvis Cocker disrupts a performance by Michael Jackson at the BRIT Awards. During an elaborate staging of "Earth Song" Cocker crashed the stage, lifted his shirt and pointed his bottom in Jackson's direction before getting into a scuffle with security. Cocker later stated that his actions were "a form of protest at the way Michael Jackson sees himself as some kind of Christ-like figure with the power of healing".
 February 20
 Snoop Dogg and his bodyguard are acquitted of first degree murder. The jury deadlocks on voluntary manslaughter charges and a mistrial is declared.
 Storytellers premieres on VH1. The first episodes features Ray Davies.
 February 22 – MCA Records buys half of Interscope Records. Time Warner had owned half of Interscope until September 1995 when it sold off its share due to political pressure for the explicit lyrics of the label's gangsta rap artists.
 February 28 – The 38th Annual Grammy Awards are presented in Los Angeles, hosted by Ellen DeGeneres. Alanis Morissette won four awards, including Album of the Year for Jagged Little Pill, while Seal's "Kiss from a Rose" wins both Record of the Year and Song of the Year. Hootie & the Blowfish win Best New Artist. The ceremony also notably features the reunion of the original lineup of Kiss, introduced by Tupac Shakur for their first appearance in full makeup and outfits since 1979.

March
 March 4 – The Beatles' second reunion song is released as part of their first reunion since the band's breakup 26 years earlier. The song is a finished version of "Real Love", a John Lennon demo from 1980.
 March 13 – Ramones fans riot in Buenos Aires, Argentina after waiting all night for concert tickets only to find out that the show had been sold out.
 March 16 – Mariah Carey and Boyz II Men's 16th consecutive week stay at No. 1 in the American charts with "One Sweet Day" ends when Celine Dion's "Because You Loved Me" reaches #1. "One Sweet Day" enjoyed the longest consecutive stay at No. 1 in the Billboard Hot 100's history.
 March 18 – The Sex Pistols announce that they will be reuniting for a 20th anniversary tour.
 March 28 – Phil Collins announces that he is leaving Genesis to focus on his solo career.

April
 April 1 
Roberto Alagna marries Angela Gheorghiu backstage at the New York Metropolitan Opera.
John Squire announces his departure from The Stone Roses.
 April 3 – M.C. Hammer files for bankruptcy.
 April 4 – The Grateful Dead's Bob Weir and Jerry Garcia's widow, Deborah, scatter part of Garcia's ashes in the Ganges River in India.             
 April 10 – Alice in Chains plays at Majestic Theatre in New York City for a MTV unplugged record and video to be released in July.
 April 15 – The remaining part of Jerry Garcia's ashes are scattered near the Golden Gate Bridge in San Francisco.
 April 16 – Madonna announces that she is four months pregnant by Carlos Leon, her then boyfriend and trainer.
 April 17 – Carlo Bergonzi gives his American farewell concert at Carnegie Hall. 
 April 24 – This Train, Rick Elias, Jimmy A, Phil Keaggy, Carolyn Arends, Third Day and Ashley Cleveland perform a tribute concert for Rich Mullins at Nashville's Cafe Milano. Speakers included Reunion Records executive Terry Hemmings, record producer Reed Arvin, disc jockey Jon Rivers, and author Brennan Manning.
 April 28 – Oasis play the second of two gigs in Maine Road, home of Manchester City F.C., featured on the video "…There and Then".

May
 May 8 
The Galway Early Music Festival is launched in Ireland.
In Los Angeles, a judge rules against Tommy Lee and wife, actress Pamela Anderson Lee, in their attempt to keep Penthouse from publishing still photos taken from an X-rated home movie that was stolen from their home.
 May 11 – A 17-year-old fan is crushed in the festival seating section at a concert by The Smashing Pumpkins in Dublin, Ireland, despite the presence of 110 security guards and repeated admonishments from the band telling the crowd to stop surging towards the stage. The fan dies of her injuries the next day and the band cancels that night's show in Belfast as a result.
 May 18 – The 1996 Eurovision Song Contest, held in Oslo Spektrum in Oslo, Norway, is won by Irish singer Eimear Quinn, with the song "The Voice". It is Ireland's record seventh, and most recent, win at Eurovision.
 May 25 – Sublime lead singer Bradley Nowell dies of a heroin overdose at age 28.
 May 30 – Depeche Mode leader Dave Gahan is arrested upon his release from hospital, having overdosed on a heroin and cocaine 'speedball' in a Los Angeles hotel room and been pronounced clinically dead for two minutes in an ambulance. Gahan is ordered by the court to complete a nine-month rehabilitation.

June
 June 2 – Alice Cooper performs at Sammy Hagar's club, Cabo Wabo, in Mexico. It was recorded and released the next year as a live album.
 June 8  – Tracy Bonham becomes the first female solo artist to reach number one on the Billboard Modern Rock Tracks chart with the single "Mother Mother". 
 June 12 – The final of the Eurovision Young Musicians 1996 competition is held in Lisbon, Portugal. The winner is German violinist and pianist Julia Fischer.
 June 15–16 – The first Tibetan Freedom Concerts are held in San Francisco.
 June 19 – Japanese duo Chage and Aska become the first Asian group to participate in MTV Unplugged.
 June 21 – The Sex Pistols start their reunion tour in Lahti, Finland.
 June 25  – Jay-Z releases his debut album Reasonable Doubt.
 June 26 – Sammy Hagar leaves Van Halen.
 June 27 – DJ Screw, creator of chopped and screwed rap and leader of Screwed Up Click, records the 35 minute long June 27 freestyle with Houston rappers Big Moe, Bird, Key-C, Yungstar, Big Pokey, DeMo, Haircut Joe and Kay-Luv.
 June 28 – Kiss kicks off the Alive/Worldwide reunion tour at Tiger Stadium in Detroit. It's the first tour by the original lineup of the band since 1979.

July
 July 3 
This World releases their first album since 1986
Alice in Chains performs their last concert with lead singer Layne Staley  in Kansas City, Missouri while touring with Kiss.
 July 8 – The Spice Girls release their debut single "Wannabe" in the United Kingdom. The song proves to be a global hit, hitting number 1 in 31 countries and becoming not only the biggest selling debut single by an all-female group but also the biggest-selling single by an all-female group of all time. 
 July 11 – Robert Simpson's second string quintet receives its première at the Cheltenham International Festival by the Maggini Quartet with Pal Banda, cellist.
 July 13 – Phil Anselmo of Pantera overdoses on heroin after a Texas homecoming gig.
July 16 – Michael Jackson performed a concert for Hassanal Bolkiah's 50th birthday at the Jerudong Park Amphitheater. 
 July 19 – The Proms in the Park event is launched in London, UK.
 July 27 – Adrian Erlandsson & Patrik Jensen form The Haunted.

August
 August 1 – MTV2 is launched. The first video played is "Where It's At" by Beck.
 August 6 – Influential punk rock group The Ramones play their final show at The Palace in Hollywood.
 August 10–11 – Oasis play the largest free-standing gigs in British history at Knebworth House, Stevenage. 2.7 Million people apply for tickets and a sold-out crowd of 350,000 attend the concerts, 175,000 each night. Stone Roses guitarist John Squire joins the band onstage to play guitar to Champagne Supernova.
 August 15–16 – Phish hosts The Clifford Ball at Plattsburgh Air Force Base. The event is the first of their festivals, currently totaling ten. 70,000 people show up. Some say the event is considered a precursor to the large scale music festivals of today.
 August 27 – Aaliyah released her album One in a Million.

September
 September 4 – At the MTV Video Music Awards, Van Halen makes a surprise appearance with original singer David Lee Roth.
 September 7
 Rapper Tupac Shakur is shot several times in what is apparently a drive-by shooting, whilst being driven from the MGM Grand Hotel along Sunset Strip in Las Vegas after seeing the allegedly fixed Mike Tyson versus Bruce Seldon boxing match. He dies six days later.
 Michael Jackson starts the HIStory World Tour.
 September 10 – Wal-Mart announces it will not be carrying Sheryl Crow's upcoming self titled album because of the lyric "Watch out, sister, watch out, brother/watch our children while they kill each other/with a gun they bought at Wal-Mart Discount Stores."
 September 11 – David Bowie's single "Telling Lies" becomes the first song offered as a digital single by a major record label (Virgin Records). Bowie launches the single by hosting an online chat in which he and two other people pretending to be him answer questions from the audience; Bowie tells the truth, while the other two are "telling lies".
 September 12 – Controversy follows The Eagles when the band dedicates "Peaceful Easy Feeling" to Saddam Hussein at a United States Democratic Party fundraiser held in Los Angeles.
 September 13 – Tupac Shakur dies as a result of injuries sustained six days earlier.
 September 21 – Meg White marries John Anthony Gillis, who took Meg's name and changed his name to Jack White. They would form The White Stripes one year later.
 September 24 – Weezer releases its second record, Pinkerton. Due to its darker vibe and its departure from their earlier style, it sold less well and was critically panned.
 September 27 – Sasha and Digweed release Northern Exposure, which has gone on to be considered one of the greatest dance albums of all time.

October
 October 4 
Eddie and Alex Van Halen announce that David Lee Roth will not be continuing as lead singer of Van Halen and that Gary Cherone will be the band's next vocalist.
C-Block releases the single "So Strung Out", which reaches fourth chart position in Germany.
 October 6 – Country singers Faith Hill and Tim McGraw get married.
 October 13 – Prince's son Gregory Nelson dies from Pfeiffer Syndrome.
 October 14 – Madonna gives birth to daughter Lourdes Maria Ciccone Leon.
 October 15 – Korn's second studio album, Life is Peachy, debuts at number 3 on the Billboard 200 and goes on to sell 6 million copies worldwide.
 October 27 – Pop-Up Video premieres on VH1.
 October 28 – MTV India is launched.
 October 29 
 Slash announces in a faxed statement that he is officially leaving Guns N' Roses.
Ian Brown and Mani officially dissolve The Stone Roses.
 October 31 – David Brookes is fined £45 in Hampstead Magistrates' Court for disrupting the "quiet enjoyment" of the public by playing his bagpipes on Hampstead Heath. Described as "a pain in the neck" by a spokesperson for the College of Pipers in Glasgow, Brookes vowed to buy a bicycle in order to continue playing in the open air, so "they'll just have to catch me." He said he had been piping on the heath for twenty years and had been given permission to do so, adding that he was surprised by the ruling because social workers were allowed to distribute condoms there.

November
 November 8 – After having been premièred at the Sundance Film Festival in January, the film Hype!, a documentary on the Seattle grunge scene, opens to general audiences.
 November 12 – Eminem releases his debut studio album Infinite.
 November 24 – Crowded House plays its farewell concert on the steps of the Sydney Opera House in Australia, in front of an audience of almost 200,000.  Proceeds from this concert support the Sydney Children's Hospital. The band subsequently reunites a decade later with a new studio album and tour.

December
 December 7 – The Sex Pistols finish their reunion tour in Santiago, Chile.
 December 16 – Max Cavalera leaves Sepultura because of Sepultura not renewing his wife Gloria's contract as manager as well as being overwhelmed by the death of his stepson.
 December 31 – The twenty-fifth annual New Year's Rockin' Eve special airs on ABC, with appearances by Shawn Colvin, KC & the Sunshine Band, Spice Girls, Squirrel Nut Zippers and Usher.

Also in 1996
 Jesper Strömblad leaves Hammerfall.
 House of Pain breaks up which leads to DJ Lethal joining Limp Bizkit.
 The Monkees embark on their 30th Anniversary Reunion Tour.
 Singer Tori Amos is sued when a man crashes his car after being distracted by a billboard advertising her album. The billboard featured a photo of Amos breastfeeding a piglet.
 Coal Chamber signs with Roadrunner Records and Mikey "Bug" Cox replaces John Tor.
 The Telecommunications Act of 1996 is passed in the United States, deregulating the number of radio and TV stations that any one broadcaster can own.

Bands formed
 See Musical groups established in 1996

Bands disbanded
 See Musical groups disestablished in 1996

Bands reunited

 The Monkees
 New Edition
 Poison
 Kiss
 Devo
 Supertramp
 Patti Smith

Albums released

January–March

April–June

July–September

October–December

Release date unknown

 All the Pretty Little Horses – Current 93
 Atom-Powered Action! – Bis – EP
 Better Can't Make Your Life Better – Lilys
 Bis vs. the D.I.Y. Corps – Bis
 Black Eye – Fluffy
 Boc Maxima – Boards of Canada
 Chixdiggit! – Chixdiggit
 Classics – Joey Beltram
 The Closing Chronicles – Nightingale
 Corey Hart – Corey Hart
 Dead Man Walking – Various Artists
 Digilogue (compact disc version) – :zoviet*France: 
 Creature – Moist
 Eleventeen (EP) – Eve 6
 Garibaldi Guard! – U.S. Bombs
 G. – Gotthard 
 Get Fired Up – Murk
 Get Your Legs Broke – Len
 Hamsters of Rock (EP) – Spacehog
 Hank Plays Holly – Hank Marvin
 Hank Plays Live – Hank Marvin
 Holy Land – Angra
 In Sides – Orbital
 Introducing Save Ferris (EP) – Save Ferris
 Katatonia/Primordial – Katatonia/Primordial
 La Passione – Chris Rea

 Lucky – Skin
 Lynda – Lynda Thomas
 Petitioning the Empty Sky – Converge 
 A Man Amongst Men – Bo Diddley
 Music of Hair – Andrew Bird
 Nénette et Boni – Tindersticks
 Neu! '72 Live in Düsseldorf – Neu!
 Not in My Airforce – Robert Pollard
 Out of the Everywhere – Angie Aparo
 Ravendusk in My Heart – Diabolical Masquerade
 The Secret Vampire Soundtrack – Bis – EP
 Shakespearean Fish – Melanie Doane
 Six Pence for the Sauces (EP) – Drake Tungsten
 The Smiths Is Dead – Various Artists – The Smiths tribute
 Still Life – The Paradise Motel
 Tao of the One Inch Punch – One Inch Punch
 Time – Steeleye Span
 Vans Warped Music Sampler 1996 – Various Artists
 Welcome to the Infant Freebase – The Soundtrack of Our Lives
 Wild Hog in the Red Brush – John Hartford

Biggest hit singles
The following songs achieved the highest chart positions in the charts of 1996.

Top 40 Chart hit singles

Other Chart hit singles

Notable singles

Other Notable singles

Classical music
 Torstein Aagaard-Nilsen – Trumpet Concerto No. 2
 Michael Berkeley – Viola Concerto (revised)
 Elliott Carter – Clarinet Concerto
 Mario Davidovsky – Quartet No. 2 for oboe, violin, viola, violoncello
 Peter Maxwell Davies – 
Strathclyde Concerto No 10: Concerto for Orchestra
Symphony No. 6
 Joël-François Durand – Les raisons des forces mouvantes for organ
 Lorenzo Ferrero – My Piece of Africa, for violin, viola, violoncello, and contrabass
 Francesco Filidei – Danza macabra, for organ
 Joep Franssens
 Sanctus for orchestra
 Winter Child for piano
 Vinko Globokar – Oblak Semen, for trombone
 Alexander Goehr – Viola Concerto
 Sofia Gubaidulina – Viola Concerto
 Hans Werner Henze – Labyrinth (revision of 1951 work)
 Wilhelm Kaiser-Lindemann – Homage a Nelson Mandela
 Wojciech Kilar –
Agnus Dei for mixed choir a cappella
Piano Concerto No. 1
 Frederik Magle –  Christmas cantata: A newborn child, before eternity, God!
 John Pickard – Third Symphony
 David Sawer – Tiroirs
 John Serry Sr. – Five Children's Pieces, for piano
 Juan Maria Solare – Diez Estudios Escénicos
 Karlheinz Stockhausen – Orchester-Finalisten

Opera
 Lorenzo Ferrero – La nascita di Orfeo
 Daron Hagen – Vera of Las Vegas
 Franz Hummel – Gesualdo (14 January 1996, Kaiserslautern)
 James MacMillan – Inés de Castro
 Michael Obst – Solaris (4 December, Muffathalle, Munich Biennale)
 Karlheinz Stockhausen – Freitag aus Licht (12 September, Leipzig Opera)

Jazz

Musical theater
 Chicago (Kander and Ebb) – Broadway revival
 A Funny Thing Happened on the Way to the Forum (Stephen Sondheim) – Broadway revival
 I Love You, You're Perfect, Now Change – off Broadway production
 The King and I (Rodgers and Hammerstein) – Broadway revival
 Once Upon a Mattress – Broadway revival
 Rent (Jonathan Larson) – Broadway production opened at the Nederlander Theatre and ran until 2008
 State Fair – Broadway production opened at the Music Box Theatre and ran for 110 performances

Musical films
 Aur Ek Prem Kahani
 Everyone Says I Love You
 Evita
 Glastonbury the Movie
 Grace of My Heart
 Hommage à Noir
 The Hunchback of Notre Dame
 Hype!
 James and the Giant Peach
 Saajan Chale Sasural
 That Thing You Do!

Births
January 1 – Kun, Chinese singer (WayV)
January 3 - Florence Pugh, English actress and singer-songwriter 
January 12 – Ella Henderson, English singer and songwriter
January 13 – Lauren Sanderson, American singer-songwriter
January 15 – Dove Cameron, American actress and singer
January 16 – Jennie Kim, South Korean rapper, singer, and model (Blackpink) 
January 17 – Alma (Finnish singer), Finnish singer, songwriter, music producer, musician and activist
January 23 – Chachi Gonzales, American actress and dancer
January 25 - Calum Hood, Australian musician, known for being the bassist and the vocalist of the pop rock band 5 Seconds of Summer. 
January 27 – Braeden Lemasters, American actor, musician, voice actor and singer (Wallows) 
January 28 – Emily Piriz, American singer
February 1 – Doyoung, South Korean singer (NCT)
February 2 – Remi Wolf, American singer-songwriter
February 3 – Rhap Salazar, Filipino singer-songwriter and actor
February 8 – Joichiro
Fujiwara, Japanese singer (Naniwa Danshi)
February 9
Chungha, South Korean singer 
Kelli Berglund, American actress, singer and dancer
February 19 
  Mabel, Spanish-born Swedish-British singer-songwriter and activist 
 Ashnikko, American singer, songwriter, rapper and activist 
February 24 – Cristian Imparato, Italian singer
February 27 – Ten, Thai singer and dancer (WayV)
February 29 – Jony, Azerbaijani-Russian singer
March 2 - Reve (singer), Canadian singer-songwriter
March 3 – Jeremy Zucker, American singer
March 17 – Tokischa, Dominican rapper, internet entertainer and performance artist  (Close wwith Madonna) 
March 24 – Jack Edward Johnson, pop rap musician in duo Jack & Jack
March 26 – Kathryn Bernardo, Filipina singer and actress
April 2 – Zach Bryan, American singer-songwriter, activist, and a former USA Navy veteran from his family tradition 
April 3 – Sarah Jeffery Canadian actress, dancer and singer
April 5 – Mura Masa, a Guernsey-born electronic music producer, songwriter and multi-instrumentalist
April 11 – Summer Walker, American singer-songwriter
April 14 – Abigail Breslin, American singer and actress
April 18 – Clau, Brazilian singer
May 1 – Mahalia (singer),  British singer, songwriter and actress
May 5 – Jax (singer), American singer-songwriter
May 9 – 6ix9ine, American rapper
May 14 – Martin Garrix – Dutch DJ and record producer
May 15 – Birdy (singer), English musician, singer and songwriter
May 16 – Baby Tate (rapper), American rapper, singer, and record producer
May 31 – Normani Kordei, American singer, songwriter, dancer and member of girl group Fifth Harmony
June 15 – Aurora,  Norwegian singer-songwriter and producer
June 25 – Lele Pons, Venezuelan-American internet personality, actress, singer, dancer and host
June 27 – Lauren Jauregui, American singer, songwriter and dancer  and member of girl group Fifth Harmony
July 2 – Beret, Spanish pop singer
July 11 – Alessia Cara, Canadian singer-songwriter
July 13 – Jena Irene, American singer-songwriter
July 16
Kevin Abstract, American rapper,singer and songwriter (Brockhampton)
Luke Hemmings, Australian singer songwriter, musician, member of 5SOS
July 18 – Yung Lean, a Swedish rapper, singer, songwriter, record producer, and fashion designer
July 23 – Klava Koka, Russian singer 
August 1
Cymphonique Miller, American actress and singer
Ellona Santiago, Filipino-American singer
August 19 - Katja Glieson, an Australian-German singer 
September 1 – Zendaya, American actress, singer and dancer
September 3 – Joy, South Korean singer, actress and host
September 5 – Sigrid, Norwegian singer-songwriter
September 6 – Lil Xan, American rapper (Noah Cyrus) 
September 10 – Jack Finnegan Gilinsky, pop rap musician in duo Jack & Jack
September 11 – Swarmz, British Rapper
September 17 – Slayyyter, American musician
September 19 
 Pia Mia, Guamanian singer, songwriter and model
 Sabrina Claudio. American singer and songwriter
September 26 – Marina Sena, Brazilian singer 
October 1 – Shenseea, Jamaican dancehall reggae performer and deejay (Jamaican)
October 7 – Lewis Capaldi, Scottish comediene, singer-songwriter, musician and activist
October 14 
 Lourdes Maria Ciccone Leon, first child of Madonna (in Los Angeles, California)
 Madison Cunningham,  American singer, songwriter and guitarist.
October 15 – Zelo, South Korean rapper
October 29 – Astrid S, Norwegian singer-songwriter-model

November 1
Lil Peep, American rapper (d. 2017)
Jeongyeon, South Korean singer (TWICE)
November 6 – Stefanie Scott, American actress and singer 
November 7 – Lorde, New Zealand indie pop singer-songwriter
November 9 – Momo Hirai, Japanese singer and dancer (TWICE)
November 19 – RiceGum, American YouTube personality, comedian and musician.
November 23 – Lia Marie Johnson, American actress, singer, and Internet personality
December 9 – AleXa, Korean-American singer.
December 11 
 Hailee Steinfeld, American actress and singer-songwriter
 Clementine Creevy, American singer-songwriter, actor, musician and model
December 17 – Kungs, French DJ, record producer and musician
December 29 – Sana Minatozaki, Japanese singer and dancer (TWICE)
 Unknown: 
 Alaska Reid, American singer-songwriter and producer
 Dora Jar, American bedroom pop musician

Deaths
January 20 – Gerry Mulligan, saxophonist, 68
January 21, in a car accident, the London Boys:
Edem Ephraim, 37
Dennis Fuller, 37
January 25 – Jonathan Larson, composer and writer of the hit Broadway musical Rent, 35 (aortic aneurysm)
January 26 – Henry Lewis, American bassist and conductor, 63 (heart attack)
January 30 – Bob Thiele, record producer, 73
February 2 – Gene Kelly, actor and dancer, 83
February 3 – Audrey Meadows, American actress and singer, 73
February 7 – Boris Tchaikovsky, composer, 70
February 15 – Wild Jimmy Spruill, guitarist, 61
February 16 – Brownie McGhee, blues singer and guitarist, 80
February 17 – Evelyn Laye, English actress and singer, 95
February 20 – Toru Takemitsu, composer, 65
February 21 – Morton Gould, composer conductor arranger ASCAP President, 82
February 26 – Mieczysław Weinberg, composer, 76
March 4 – Minnie Pearl, comedian and country musician, 83
March 15 – Olga Rudge, violinist, 101
March 22 – Don Murray, drummer (The Turtles), 50 (post-operative complications)
March 31 – Jeffrey Lee Pierce, singer and songwriter (The Gun Club), 37
April 2 – Booba Barnes, blues singer and guitarist, 59 (cancer)
April 18 – Bernard Edwards (Chic), 43 (pneumonia)
May 8 – Celedonio Romero, leader of the Romeros guitar quartet, 83
May 10 – Ethel Smith, organist, 93
May 11 – Walter Hyatt, singer/songwriter, 46
May 17
Kevin Gilbert, studio engineer, songwriter with Toy Matinee, Tuesday Night Music Club, 29 (asphyxiation)
Johnny "Guitar" Watson – guitarist, 61 (myocardial infarction) 
May 25 – Brad Nowell, lead singer and guitarist of Sublime, 28 (heroin overdose)
May 30 – John Kahn, rock bassist, 48
June 15 – Ella Fitzgerald, jazz singer, 79
June 20 – Jim Ellison, singer and guitarist of Material Issue, 32
July 12 – Jonathan Melvoin, touring keyboardist for The Smashing Pumpkins, 34 (heroin overdose)
July 16 – John Panozzo, drummer for Styx and brother of Chuck Panozzo, 47
July 17
Chas Chandler (The Animals), 57 (heart attack)
Marcel Dadi, French country and western guitarist, 44 (in the crash of TWA Flight 800)
July 22 – Rob Collins, original keyboardist of The Charlatans, 31
July 29 – Jason Thirsk, Pennywise bassist, 28 (suicide)
August 11 – Mel Taylor, drummer (The Ventures), 62 (cancer)
August 13 – David Tudor, pianist and composer, 70
August 14
Sergiu Celibidache, Romanian conductor, 84
Al Cleveland, songwriter and producer, 66 (heart disease)
August 23 – Jurriaan Andriessen, Dutch composer, 71
September 1 – Vagn Holmboe, Danish composer, 83
September 9 – Bill Monroe, bluegrass singer, composer and mandolin player, 84
September 12 – Eleazar de Carvalho, Brazilian orchestral conductor and composer, 84
September 13 – Tupac Shakur, rapper, poet, actor, 25 (shot)
September 28 – Bob Gibson, folk singer/songwriter, 64
October 2 – Joonas Kokkonen, Finnish composer, 75
October 6 – Ted Daffan, country musician, 84
October 11 – Renato Russo, lead singer and composer for Legião Urbana, 36
October 17
Berthold Goldschmidt, German composer, 93
Chris Acland, Lush drummer, 30 (suicide)
November 2 – Eva Cassidy, American vocalist, 33 (skin cancer)
November 5 – Eddie Harris, jazz saxophonist, pianist and organist, 62
November 10 – Manik Varma, Indian classical musician, 76
November 13 – Bill Doggett, jazz and R&B pianist and organist, 80 (heart attack)
November 30 – Tiny Tim, musician, 64
December 5 – Wilf Carter, Canadian country musician, 91
December 10 – Faron Young, country singer, 64
December 15 – Dave Kaye, British pianist, 90
December 29
Mireille, French singer, 90
Jerry Knight, vocalist, bassist, songwriter and producer, 44

Awards
 1996 Country Music Association Awards
 Eurovision Song Contest 1996
 Grammy Awards of 1996
 1996 MTV Video Music Awards
 Mercury Music Prize, awarded to Different Class, the album  by Pulp.
 Rock and Roll Hall of Fame. The following artists were inducted: David Bowie, Gladys Knight and the Pips, Jefferson Airplane, Little Willie John, Pink Floyd, The Shirelles and The Velvet Underground.
 Glenn Gould Prize: Toru Takemitsu (laureate); Tan Dun (protégé)

Charts

See also
 1996 in music (UK)
 :Category:Record labels established in 1996
 Triple J Hottest 100, 1996

References

 
20th century in music
Music by year